The eradication of lymphatic filariasis is the ongoing attempt to eradicate the Filarioidea worms which cause the disease lymphatic filariasis and also treat the people who already have the infection.

In 1998, various countries established the Global Programme to Eliminate Lymphatic Filariasis as a project of the World Health Organization. This international effort had the goal of having eradication programs in every country to eliminate the disease globally.

Eradication plan
The disease spreads when a mosquito transfers a worm parasite through mosquito bite. In various regions the species of worm and mosquito can vary. The prevention and treatment plans differ according to whatever is effective against the species in a given region.

The creation of maps and planning of local monitoring systems has been an essential part of all regional eradication plans.

By region
In the 1970s there was an eradication experiment in French Polynesia. Samoa and Fiji did experiments in the early 1990s. These practical experiments in eradication became models for LF eradication for the rest of the world to use.

A 2018 update for Madagascar reported that many people still tested positive for parasite.

China participated in the program and became LF free in 2007. Prior to that, the disease had been in China since ancient times. In the 1980s China had 30 million people with the disease.

As of 2016 various countries in South East Asia were at different phases in their national elimination programs. Bangladesh, Thailand, Maldives, and Sri Lanka all ended their mass drug administration programs due to success in elimination. India, Indonesia, East Timor, Nepal, and Myanmar are actively doing mass drug administration.

Thailand took a baseline survey of LF in 2001. From 2002 to 2011 the country did MDA. In September 2017, the World Health Organization declared Thailand to be free of LF.

Tonga did MDA from 2001 to 2006. The World Health Organization declared the country free of LF in 2017.

References

Further reading
 

Infectious diseases with eradication efforts
Lymphatic filariasis